Raúl Ibáñez Galdón (born 10 November 1972) is a Spanish retired footballer who played as a forward.

Club career
Born in Tous, Valencia, Ibáñez began his career in his local community, being noticed by Valencia CF in the 1994 summer and moving to the reserve team. He made his La Liga debut on 9 April 1995, playing 37 minutes in a 0–0 away draw against Celta de Vigo, and started the following week, scoring his first and only top flight goal as the Che won it at home over Real Betis (2–1); he suffered a serious injury in the season's final stretch.

After that sole campaign, Ibáñez moved to Real Valladolid, being regularly used as a substitute – only 16 starts in two full seasons combined – and also being loaned to Levante UD for 1997–98, suffering Segunda División relegation with the team. He then spent some months with Puebla FC, joining compatriot Miguel Pardeza in the Mexican club.

After an unassuming second division campaign with Elche CF (less than one third of the games played, 512 minutes of action), Ibáñez returned to Valladolid and the Spanish top flight in the 2000 summer, but did not take part in any matches due to injuries and loss of form. Subsequently, he resumed his career in the lower leagues, with Cultural y Deportiva Leonesa, Tomelloso CF, CD Burriana, Burjassot CF and CD Olímpic de Xàtiva, retiring in late 2006 at the age of 34.

References

External links

CiberChe stats and bio 

1972 births
Living people
People from Ribera Alta (comarca)
Sportspeople from the Province of Valencia
Spanish footballers
Footballers from the Valencian Community
Association football forwards
La Liga players
Segunda División players
Segunda División B players
Tercera División players
UD Alzira footballers
Valencia CF Mestalla footballers
Valencia CF players
Real Valladolid players
Levante UD footballers
Elche CF players
Cultural Leonesa footballers
CD Olímpic de Xàtiva footballers
Liga MX players
Club Puebla players
Spanish expatriate footballers
Expatriate footballers in Mexico